Robert Best may refer to:
 Robert Henry Best (1896–1952), American foreign correspondent convicted of treason in 1948
 Robert Best (politician) (1856–1946), Australian federal politician
 Robert Dudley Best (1892–1984), Birmingham-based British industrial designer
 Robert Best, doll designer for Mattel who appeared on U.S. TV series Project Runway